Sister San Sulpicio (Spanish:La hermana San Sulpicio) is a 1952 Spanish comedy film directed by Luis Lucia and starring Carmen Sevilla, Jorge Mistral and Julia Caba Alba. It was the third film adaptation of Armando Palacio Valdés's 1889 novel Sister San Sulpicio.

Plot 
Gloria and Ceferino are two totally opposite people. He is a Galician doctor, serious and circumspect; she, on the other hand, is a beautiful Andalusian, rich and with an outgoing and dominant character. However, Gloria makes a surprising and unusual decision: to become a nun. By chance, she is assigned to a sanatorium of which Dr. Ceferino has been appointed as the new director. Love will arise between them, but they cannot marry because she is a nun.

Cast
 Carmen Sevilla as Gloria Alvargonzález / Hermana San Sulpicio  
 Jorge Mistral as Ceferino Sanjurjo 
 Julia Caba Alba as Hermana Guadalupe  
 Milagros Carrión
 Juana Ginzo 
 Manuel Guitián 
 Manolo Gómez Bur as Daniel Suárez  
 Casimiro Hurtado 
 Ana de Leyva 
 Manuel Luna as D. Sabino  
 Juana Mansó 
 Antonio Ozores 
 Antonio Riquelme 
 Rosario Royo

References

Bibliography
 Mira, Alberto. The A to Z of Spanish Cinema. Rowman & Littlefield, 2010.

External links 

1952 films
Spanish comedy films
1952 comedy films
1950s Spanish-language films
Films directed by Luis Lucia
Films scored by Juan Quintero Muñoz
1950s Spanish films